Piranha II: The Spawning (released internationally as Piranha II: Flying Killers) is a 1982 horror film directed by James Cameron (in his feature directorial debut) from a screenplay by Charles H. Eglee (under the pseudonym H. A. Milton). The film stars Tricia O'Neil and Lance Henriksen, who would later star in Cameron's The Terminator and Aliens. It is the second installment in the Piranha film series and the sequel to Piranha (1978).

Cameron, previously a special effects artist for Roger Corman, was hired as director after executive producer Ovidio G. Assonitis fired his predecessor. The production was fraught with difficulties arising from Assonitis' exerting an unusual amount of creative control, hiring an Italian crew that didn't speak English and preventing Cameron from viewing any footage during the editing process. The exact degree of creative control Cameron had has been disputed by multiple sources, with some claims arising that Assonitis fired Cameron after two weeks and directed the film on his own while others maintain that Cameron was present for the entirety of principal photography.

After its release, Cameron largely disowned Piranha II for many years, but has since acknowledged the film as his directorial debut. A director's cut exists only on Laserdisc and VHS. In 2003, Sony Pictures released the film on Region A DVD in a full-frame format. In other regions, the DVD was released in a widescreen format. In 2018, Scream Factory released the film on Region A Blu-ray in an improved widescreen transfer. It received negative reviews upon release and was a box office bomb, but has enjoyed later success as a cult film by fans of James Cameron.

Plot
A Caribbean coastal resort, Hotel Elysium, is menaced by a series of vicious marine animal attacks originating from a nearby sunken shipwreck. Diving instructor Anne Kimbrough's student is one of the victims, but her estranged police officer husband Steve refuses to let her see the corpse. Soon after, two women and a man are killed by piranha which has developed the ability to fly.

Concerned, Anne finds that she is being frequently bothered by tourist Tyler Sherman, and decides to take him with her to the morgue to get a look at the body. A nurse comes in and kicks them out, unaware that a piranha was hiding in the body. It kills the nurse and escapes through a window.

In her hurry, Anne left her credit card behind at the scene. Anne and Tyler have a one-night stand. In the morning she begins to study the pictures of the corpse, and is horrified by what she discovers. Steve arrives, throwing the card at her, angry that she went to the morgue and that she has a man in her bed. She tries to warn him of what she has discovered, but he ignores her.

Anne then tries to cancel the diving sessions, leading to her getting fired by her manager. Attempting to capture one as proof of the incoming threat, she is intercepted by Tyler, who informs her that he is a biochemist and member of a team which has developed the ultimate weapon: a specimen of genetically modified piranha, capable of flying. He explains that his team lost a cylinder full of these fish in the water earlier.

Gabby provides the proof Anne needs to Steve, showing him that they are a serious danger, as they are now eating each other. At a meeting, Anne tries her best to reason with the manager, to no avail. Steve provides a piranha wing as evidence. Steve tells her that she cannot trust Tyler, because the army says he is crazy.

Later, a piranha attacks Gabby's son and kills him, leaving Gabby to vow revenge. Anne tries to dissuade him, but fails. Having ignored Anne's advice, the manager, Raoul, hosts a nighttime fish party to capture grunion. Unfortunately for the residents, the piranha join the hunt. Anne gets a man named Aaron to patrol the beach but he is lured to the sea where the piranha kill him. During the fishing party promoted by the resort, the piranhas fly out of the water and attack the guests. Anne leads the survivors into the hotel, where they shut the doors and windows. Gabby tries to attack the flying piranha, but they easily overwhelm and kill him.

In the morning, the piranha leave as they do not like the light. Tyler and Anne decide to undertake Gabby's plan, and blow up the ship to kill the predators. Meanwhile, Anne and Steve's son Chris has been hired, against their wishes, by a local ship 'Captain' Dumont and his daughter Allison. They sail away and strand themselves on an island. They get lost at sea and try to set sail again, heading straight toward the wreck.

When Chris and Allison are stranded in a raft above the shipwreck, Anne and Tyler arrive in a motorboat and dive down to the wreck to plant the timer charges that Gabby left behind. With only 10 minutes to get out of the wreck before the bomb explodes, Anne and Tyler are trapped in one of the sunken ships rooms by the murderous piranha who all return to the wreck. Steve, piloting a police helicopter, ditches the chopper and swims to Anne and Tyler's motorboat where Chris and Allison are. Steve powers up the boat and takes off. Down in the wreck, Tyler gets stuck and is eaten by the piranhas. Anne escapes out of a porthole, then grabs the anchor, allowing herself to be pulled away by the motorboat on the surface. The bomb detonates, destroying the sunken ship and all the piranha with it. With all the piranhas dead, Anne swims to the surface and is picked up by Steve, Chris, and Allison in their boat.

Cast

Production

Development 
After the release and financial success of Joe Dante's Piranha, producers Jeff Schechtman and Chako van Leuwen immediately began work on a sequel film. Roger Corman, the head of New World Pictures which had produced and released the first film, did not share either person's interest, instead focusing on his own "underwater horror" film Humanoids from the Deep. Schechtman and van Leuwen purchased the sequel rights from Corman, first setting up an independent production company before developing a script with writers Charles H. Eglee and Channing Gibson, based on a treatment by New World producer Martin B. Cohen.

Because Dante was already attached to direct The Howling for New World, the producers approached Dante's former colleague Miller Drake as prospective director. Drake had worked alongside Dante in New World's trailer department and had essayed the role of "First Mutant" in Dante's directorial debut, Hollywood Boulevardbefore becoming Corman's de facto head of post-production. With a tentative director in place, the producers' sought financing and eventually struck a deal with Ovidio G. Assonitis, a Greco-Italian filmmaker who had produced and directed several successful low-budget "cash-in" films aimed at the American import market. Drake set to work developing a script with Eglee, who would later collaborate with James Cameron on the TV show Dark Angel. Drake's intention was that Piranha II should hinge upon Kevin McCarthy's scientist from Piranha, even though he had seemingly perished in the first movie.

"I pitched this idea of bringing Kevin McCarthy back, all chewed up and mutilated from the previous movie," says Drake. "He was on an abandoned oil rig and he was developing these flying piranhas out there to get revenge, or whatever. I think we were going to bring Barbara Steele back and have him kill her by smashing her head through a fish tank."

Plans changed as neither McCarthy nor Steele were available, and the script was eventually re-written as a standalone story without returning characters. James Cameron, another New World alumnus, was hired as the special effects director. Some time before principal photography started, Miller Drake was fired by Assonitis and Cameron was promoted to director. Piranha II would be his feature directorial debut.

Filming 
The primary location for the film was the Mallards Beach-Hyatt Hotel (later renamed to Moon Palace Jamaica resort), in Ocho Rios, Jamaica, which served as the film's fictional Club Elysium resort. Most of the underwater scenes were filmed off Grand Cayman. Interior scenes were filmed on a sound stage in Rome.

Due to budget limitations the crew was composed essentially of Italians, none of whom spoke English. Some however did have prior experience on horror/fantasy movies so they were, to some extent, able to satisfy Cameron's requirements. Among the crew was veteran horror cinematographer Roberto D'Ettorre Piazzoli (whose name is misspelled "Roberto D'Ettore Piazzoli" in the opening credits). The special effects were designed and supervised by Giannetto De Rossi, who had previously worked on Lucio Fulci's Zombi 2 and The Beyond.

After the first week of shooting, the set harmony was disturbed by some discussions about the work between the director and the producers (Assonitis, asked to verify the day-to-day activities, arguing with most of Cameron's choices), so while Cameron was only responsible for the shooting, most of the decisions were under Assonitis' authority.

As in the first film, which was one of many horror films inspired by the success of Steven Spielberg's film Jaws (1975), piranhas act as the antagonist monsters harming human life, and have developed the ability to fly, which they did not have in the first film. On the Terminator 2: Judgment Day commentary track, Cameron jokingly defended the film, tongue firmly in cheek, as "the finest flying killer fish horror/comedy ever made". He would later employ some of the same mechanisms used to make the piranhas fly in the facehugger animatronics for Aliens.

Post-production 

According to Dreaming Aloud, a biography of Cameron by Christopher Heard, Cameron was not allowed to see his footage and was not involved in editing. He broke into the editing room in Rome and cut his own version while the film's producers were at Cannes, but was caught and Assonitis recut it again.

In a 2008 interview on The Hour, Cameron jokingly denied breaking into the editing room, then recounted the story as a "hypothetical scenario", and told host George Stroumboulopoulos how he "would've broken into the office" if he actually did it.

Cameron was able to make a deal with a distributor, who agreed to buy his footage and allow him to re-score and re-cut the picture-basically restructure it to what was originally intended-before release, so his alternative vision eventually came out on home video in some regions, which made a profit for the distributor.

Reception

Critical response
Some critics called the film "abject", others opined that "the piranhas...look as though they had been remaindered from a joke shop" and that they resembled "haddock with dentures". According to Tim Healey in The World's Worst Movies (1986) the film is "a strong contender...for anyone's list of all-time horror turkeys". The film holds a 5% approval rating on Rotten Tomatoes, based on 19 reviews. It was a box-office bomb. On Metacritic, the film has a 15/100 based on 5 reviews, meaning "overwhelming dislike".

James Cameron refers to The Terminator as his first feature-length film, despite the fact that it was made in 1984, two years after Piranha II: The Spawning. However, Cameron acknowledged the film in a 60 Minutes segment with interviewer Morley Safer in 2010, referring to Piranha II as "the best flying piranha film ever made".

References

External links

 
 
 

1982 films
1982 horror films
American independent films
American natural horror films
American sequel films
Italian horror films
Italian independent films
Italian sequel films
Dutch horror films
Dutch independent films
Dutch sequel films
1982 directorial debut films
English-language Italian films
English-language Dutch films
Films about piranhas
Films directed by James Cameron
Films scored by Stelvio Cipriani
Films shot in the Cayman Islands
Films shot in Jamaica
Columbia Pictures films
1980s English-language films
1980s American films
1980s Italian films